Mafia Airport  is an airport on Mafia Island in the Pwani Region of Tanzania.

In 2013 the landing strip at Mafia Airport was rehabilitated using grant funds provided by the United States government through the Millennium Challenge Corporation.

The Mafia non-directional beacon (Ident: MF) is located on the field.

Airlines and destinations

See also

 List of airports in Tanzania
 Transport in Tanzania

References

External links

Tanzania Airports Authority
OurAirports - Mafia Island
OpenStreetMap - Mafia Island

Airports in Tanzania